Quintus Caecilius Metellus Nepos may refer to:

 Quintus Caecilius Metellus Nepos (consul 98 BC)
 Quintus Caecilius Metellus Nepos (consul 57 BC)

See also
 Quintus Caecilius Metellus (disambiguation)